Ilford station is a station stop in Ilford, Manitoba, Canada.  Outside of Ilford, the next nearest community to the station is York Landing, about 43 km to the west.  The stop is served by Via Rail's Winnipeg–Churchill train.

Footnotes

External links 
Via Rail Station Information

Via Rail stations in Manitoba